In international relations and treaties, the principle of reciprocity states that favors, benefits, or penalties that are granted by one state to the citizens or legal entities of another, should be returned in kind.

For example, reciprocity has been used in the reduction of tariffs, the grant of copyrights to foreign authors, the mutual recognition and enforcement of judgments, and the relaxation of travel restrictions and visa requirements.

The principle of reciprocity also governs agreements on extradition.

Specific and diffuse reciprocity
Several theorists have drawn a distinction between specific forms of reciprocity and "diffuse reciprocity" (Keohane 1986).  While specific reciprocity is exemplified by international trade negotiations, as suggested above, diffuse reciprocity points to a wider institutionalisation of trust.  Through consistent cooperation in an international society, states are seen as building generally accepted standards of behaviour.  These general standards exert their own normative pressure on state action, contributing to the development of long-term obligations between states which stress cooperation.  Thus in a system of diffuse reciprocity, states need not seek the immediate benefit guaranteed by specific reciprocity, but can act in the confidence that their cooperative actions will be repaid in the long run.

See also
 Comity
 Admission on motion, a specialized form of reciprocity concerning admission to the bar of certain U.S. states

References 

 Keohane, Robert O. (1986), “Reciprocity in international relations”, in International Organization, Vol. 40, No.1.

Further reading 

`

International law
International relations theory